Justus Zeyen (born 9 June 1963) is a German pianist and accompanist.

Life 
Born in Kiel, Zeyen first received violin and piano lessons (among others) with Cord Garben). In 1980, he successfully participated in the national competition Jugend musiziert and received a scholarship of the Richard Wagner Foundation in 1982 and 1986. In addition, he took courses with Erik Werba and Hartmut Höll.

Zeyen's musical focus lies in chamber music. He gives concerts worldwide as a soloist, but above all as a lieder pianist. Prominent accompanists have included Juliane Banse, Christiane Iven, Sibylla Rubens, Doris Soffel, Siegfried Lorenz, Michael Schade and Bernd Weikl as well as the choirs of the Bavarian and South German Radio. Numerous recordings and radio broadcasts complement his musical work. Since the first joint concerts at the Kremerata Musica in Lockenhaus in Burgenland in 1994, Justus Zeyen has worked regularly with Thomas Quasthoff. Measha Brueggergosman has himself accompanied by Justus Zeyen in song recitals.

Among other things, Zeyen teaches correpetition at the music academy in Hannover.

Awards
 Cannes Classical Award 2001
 Echo Klassik 2001

Recordings 
 Lieder von Brahms und Liszt (with Thomas Quasthoff) DGG 477 7433 (2000)
 Franz Schubert: Schwanengesang, Johannes Brahms: Vier ernste Gesänge (with Thomas Quasthoff) DGG 471 0302 (2001)
 A Romantic Songbook (with Thomas Quasthoff) DGG 474 5012 (2004)
 Franz Schubert: Die schöne Müllerin (with Thomas Quasthoff) DGG 474 2182 (2005)

References

External links 
 
 

German classical pianists
Classical accompanists
Academic staff of the Hochschule für Musik, Theater und Medien Hannover
1963 births
Living people
Musicians from Kiel